Jarmina is a village and municipality in the Vukovar-Syrmia County in Croatia.

Name
In German the village is known as Jahrmein or Hermann, in Hungarian as Járomnaszentmiklós, and in Serbian Cyrillic as Јармина.

Demographics
First German settlers moved to the village from 1770 onwards while the school in German language was established in 1790. Historical records indicate that increase in tax burdens in 1770 forced the entire local Serb population as well as large majority of Croats to leave the settlement.

Before World War II there was a substantial German-speaking Danube Swabian population here.

According to the 2011 census, there are 2,458 inhabitants, 99.27% which are Croats.

Characteristics
The municipality is home to a monument to defenders and civilians killed in the Croatian War of Independence which has the names of 15 deceased people.

Near Borinci, a hamlet between Jarmina and Vinkovci, there is a 171 metres tall guyed mast for FM-/TV-broadcasting.

Jarmina is unofficial name of the Vinkovci Marshaling yard and freight railway station.

See also
 Vukovar-Syrmia County
 Syrmia

References

Sources
 

Municipalities of Croatia
Populated places in Syrmia
Populated places in Vukovar-Syrmia County